"Love Me & Let Me Go" is a song by Ashley Tisdale from her third studio album, Symptoms. It was released as the album's second and final single on January 25, 2019, through label Big Noise.

Background and composition
Speaking about the meaning of the song in an interview with Entertainment Weekly, Tisdale stated:

Musically, "Love Me & Let Me Go" is a "moody" pop song that contains "electro-kissed production", a "skittering beat", and a breakdown in the song's chorus. Though the lyrics were interpreted as Tisdale demanding space from a past lover, Tisdale later revealed the song to be about her struggles with anxiety.

Critical reception
Mike Nied, writing for Idolator, praised the song's chorus and called the song "sleek and sassy". Madeline Roth of MTV called the song "a much-welcome comeback from the singer-songwriter, who's giving fans a vulnerable side of herself they've never seen before."

Music video
A music video was released to accompany the single on January 30, 2019. Speaking about the video, Tisdale stated "the music video represents the feelings of being trapped and needing to let go". Different stages of anxiety are symbolized in the video. The video begins with the singer sitting alone in a blacked-out room. As the video progresses, it becomes brighter, symbolizing the singer gaining control of her anxiety. The final moments show the singer levitating above the ground, having broken free.

Track listing

Digital download
"Love Me & Let Me Go" – 2:46

Personnel
Adapted from Tidal.
Ashley Tisdale – lead artist, songwriter
John Feldmann – songwriter, producer
Dylan McLean – songwriter
Scot Stewart – songwriter
Whitney Phillips – songwriter

Release history

References 

2019 songs
2019 singles
Ashley Tisdale songs
Songs written by Ashley Tisdale
Songs written by John Feldmann
Songs written by Whitney Phillips